Levin Goldschmidt (30 May 1829 – 16 July 1897) was a German jurist, judge and academic. He was a Judge at the Reichsoberhandelsgericht and a professor at the University of Berlin. Between 1875 and 1877 he also served as a member of the German Parliament.

Life
From 1847 to 1851 he pursued his studies at the universities of Berlin, Bonn, and Heidelberg, receiving his doctor's degree in 1851 from the University of Halle. He practised for several years in the courts of Danzig, became privatdozent at the University of Heidelberg in 1855, and was appointed associate professor in 1860. During the years 1857 to 1860 he published Kritik des Entwurfs eines Handelsgesetzbuchs für die Preussischen Staaten and Gutachten über den Entwurf eines Deutschen Handelsgesetzbuchs nach den Beschlüssen Zweiter Lesung, which at once attracted attention to him as a critical jurist. During the same period he published Der Lucca-Pistoja-Aktienstreit, Frankfurt, 1859 (Supplement, 1861). He was the founder (1858) of the Zeitschrift für das Gesamte Handelsrecht.

Goldschmidt's scholarship was next displayed in his Encyclopädie der Rechtswissenschaft im Grundriss, Heidelberg, 1862. He then began the great work which occupied him during the remainder of his life, but which he did not live to complete, namely, Das Handbuch des Handelsrechts, Erlangen, 1864–68. This is the work with which his fame as a historical jurist is identified, it being recognized as a masterly presentation of the general history of commercial law.

In 1866, Goldschmidt was promoted to a professorship in the law faculty at Heidelberg. He next received the appointment of Justizrat in the Bundesgericht at Leipzig, afterward occupying a judicial position at the Reichsoberhandelsgericht. In 1875, he became professor of commercial law in Berlin University, and received the title Geheimer Justizrat. From 1875 to 1877 he was also a member of the German Reichstag, representing the city of Leipzig. 

In the late 1880s, Goldschmidt was the doctoral adviser to Max Weber, who was awarded his doctoral degree in 1889 for his dissertation "Die Entwickelung des Solidarhaftprinzips und des Sondervermögens der offenen Handelsgesellschaft aus den Haushalts- und Gewerbegemeinschaften in den italienischen Städten". The expanded dissertation was published by Weber as "Zur Geschichte der Handelsgesellschaften des Mittelalters. Nach südeuropäischen Quellen". 

Of Goldschmidts further publications the following deserve special mention: Das Dreijährige Studium der Rechts- und Staatswissenschaften, Berlin, 1878; Erwerbs- und Wirtschaftsgenossenschaften, Studien und Vorschläge, Stuttgart, 1882; Rechtsstudium und Prüfungsordnung, ib. 1887; Die Haftpflicht der Genossen und das Umlageverfahren, Berlin, 1888; System des Handelsrechts, Stuttgart, 1887, 4th ed., 1891.

Bibliography

See also 
 Max Weber

1829 births
1897 deaths
Jurists from Gdańsk
People from the Province of Prussia
Jewish German politicians
National Liberal Party (Germany) politicians
Members of the 2nd Reichstag of the German Empire
19th-century German lawyers
University of Bonn alumni

References